Microbacterium proteolyticum is a bacterium from the genus Microbacterium which has been isolated from the roots of the plant Halimione portulacoides in Ria de Aveiro, Portugal.

References

External links
Type strain of Microbacterium proteolyticum at BacDive -  the Bacterial Diversity Metadatabase	

Bacteria described in 2015
proteolyticum